is a Japanese television series produced by Tsuburaya Productions and Chubu-Nippon Broadcasting. It is the 20th TV series and 40th anniversary production in the Ultra Series, which first began in 1966. It premiered on the Tokyo Broadcasting System on April 8, 2006. Unlike the two prior entries, Ultraman Nexus (2004) and Ultraman Max (2005), Mebius was moved from Saturday mornings to Saturday evenings at 05:30 and the show went on to air in Korea in April 2012.

On October 22, 2014, Crunchyroll announced that the entire series would be available that day on their streaming service for the US, Canada, Latin America, Mainland Europe (except France, Belgium, Netherlands, Luxembourg, Italy, Switzerland, Germany and Austria, Spain, Portugal, Andorra, Monaco, Liechtenstein and Former Communist and Non-communist states in Eastern Europe (eg, Central, Post-Soviet states in Europe and Southeastern Europe), and Finland, Iceland and Norway, Denmark and Sweden), UK and Ireland, Australia, and New Zealand. On February 26, 2018, Toku announced that they would broadcast the series in the United States on their television channel, starting on March 19, 2018.

The series opens with the introduction of the rookie Ultraman Mebius, who is sent to Earth by the Father of Ultra. The series is set 40 years after the shows of Ultraman (1966), and makes many references from Ultra Q (1966) through to Ultraman 80 (1980). "Mebius" is the Japanese approximation of Möbius; the Möbius strip is a recurring motif in the series.

Plot
Before leaving for the earth, Ultraman Mebius was granted the Mebius Brace by the father of Ultra and told of the importance of the name "Ultraman", a legacy he would have to live up to when he reached Earth. On his way there, Mebius saw a transport ship being sucked into the ultra zone, The crew was saved by the sacrifice of the Captain's son Hiroto ban. seeing his selflessness, Mebius tried to save the young man but was a minute too late. He created his human form after the young man, Hiroto Ban, in his honor.

Characters

Crew GUYS
GUYS (Guards for UtilitY Situation) is an attack team formed at some point of time after UGM's disbandment. As no monster attacks were recorded since the last 25 years, Dinozaur had killed a majority of the original team members, save for the cadet named Ryu Aihara. Once Mirai and Sakomizu joined GUYS, the former recruited several civilians he encountered prior due to their commitment at the height of monster attacks.

Field members
: see here
: The 20-year-old sole survivor of his original Crew GUYS team during Dinozaur's attack. As he becomes the field commander, Ryu is dedicated to protect his new teammates and eventually acknowledges their skill to be on an equal level with past attack teams.
: A 19-year-old motorcycle racer with enhanced sense of hearing.
: A 20-year-old professional soccer player with enhanced sense of sight and reflexes, which allows him to utilize ranged weapons at a precision rate.
: An 18-year-old aspiring nursery school teacher working part time at a nursery school, her dedication to save the rabbits lead to an assembly of civilians that would become future members of Crew GUYS. Although usually works as an operator, she can also join the battle and guiding the Maquette Monsters.
: An 18-year-old team member who is knowledgeable in the Ultra Brothers' exploits and their fight against monsters. Being a medical student, he was groomed to become the heir of his father's hospital, but gained the blessing from his parents to continue working on Crew GUYS after his bravery in saving the building from Insectus' invasion.
: The commander of the new Crew GUYS after Serizawa's seeming death. Despite his appearance as a 40-year-old, he was actually a veteran in the defense force and was once an SSSP member whose encounter with Zoffy lead to the foundation of GUYS. His encounter on space resulted in a permanent youthful appearance despite being 70 years old.
: The 30-year-old original commander of the previous Crew GUYS, he was thought to be killed by Dinozaur's rampage after saving Ryu, but his body was rescued by Hunter Knight Tsurugi as a human shell to operate on Earth. During Tsurugi's brief death, Serizawa's will resurfaced as he persistent on the Ultra's survival. From that day on, Serizawa becomes a permanent host of Hikari and occasionally assisting Crew GUYS in their fight.

Staff members
: The leader of the Japanese branch of GUYS, he issues orders to GUYS and gets frantic with joy whenever they accomplish a mission. While generally portrayed as cowardly, sycophantic and bumbling incompetent throughout the series, he gathers his resolve and stands up to Inspector Shiki when the latter demands that GUYS turn Ultraman Mebius/Hibino Mirai over.
: Toriyama's secretary, he follows Toriyama around and often corrects his speech mistakes.
: The deputy inspector general, she reports monsters to GUYS.

Ultra Warriors
Ultraman Mebius: see here
After killing the monster and freed from the armor, the scientist Ultra adopted the name "Ultraman Hikari" from Ryu and received his membership from the Space Garrison to assist Mebius several of his fights on Earth.

Episodes

Side stories
Ultraman Mebius had three side stories in accordance to the series.
Ultraman Mebius Side Story: Hikari Saga (2006)  The first side story, separated into three parts and launched as FLET's internet television service, before being released on DVD in 2007. The story took place during the series' run, featuring Ultraman Hikari as the main viewpoint character, ranging from his past to his membership in Space Garrison.
Ultraman Mebius Side Story: Armored Darkness (2008)  The second side story, separated into two parts and sold on DVD. The story took place after the final episode of the series.
Ultraman Mebius Side Story: Ghost Reverse (2009)  The third and final side story, separated into two parts and sold on DVD. The story serves as a prologue to the 2009 Ultra Series movie, Mega Monster Battle: Ultra Galaxy.

Cast
Mirai Hibino, : 
Ryu Aihara: 
Marina Kazama: 
George Ikaruga: 
Konomi Amagai: 
Teppei Kuze: 
Shingo Sakomizu: 
Aide Toriyama: 
Secretary Aide Maru: 
Yuki Misaki: 
Kazuya Serizawa: 
Mysterious woman (Bogal) : 
: 
: 
: 
 operator: 
Nursery school teacher: 
: 
: 
: 
: 
Man in black:

Guest cast

: 
: 
: 
Announcer (31): 
: 
Medium (33): 
: 
: 
: 
: 
: 
Man in black (42-44): 
: 
: 
: 
: 
: 
: 
: 
Mother (48, 49):

Voice actors
Ultraman Hikari/Hunter Knight Tsurugi, : 
: 
: 
: 
: 
: 
: 
: 
: 
: 
Mebi-Navi narration: 
Opening narration of episodes 27-30:

Songs 
Opening theme

Lyrics: Goro Matsui
Composition: Kisaburo Suzuki
Arrangement: Seiichi Kyoda
Artist: Project DMM (Verse 1, Episodes 1 – 26; Verse 2, Episodes 27 – 50)
Insert songs
"Run through! - Wandaba" CREW GUYS ""
Lyrics: Kazuho Mitsuda 
Composition / Arrangement: Toru Fuyuki 
Artist: Project DMM with TMC
"Radiance-Ultraman Hikari's Theme"
Lyrics and composition: Hideaki Takatori 
Arrangement: Hiromasa Kasashima 
Artist: Project DMM
"Oath to you"
Lyrics, composition, arrangement: Daimon Kazuya 
Artist: Project DMM
"Ultra miracle" 
Lyrics, composition, arrangement: Daimon Kazuya 
Artist: Project DMM

Film tie-ins 
A theatrical film, entitled Ultraman Mebius & Ultraman Brothers, was released in Japan on September 16, 2006. It takes place sometime after the end of episode 15 ("Phoenix's Fortress"), and is referenced in episode 24 ("Yapool's Rebirth").

Home media
In July 2020, Shout! Factory announced to have struck a multi-year deal with Alliance Entertainment and Mill Creek, with the blessings of Tsuburaya and Indigo, that granted them the exclusive SVOD and AVOD digital rights to the Ultra series and films (1,100 TV episodes and 20 films) acquired by Mill Creek the previous year. Ultraman Mebius, amongst other titles, will stream in the United States and Canada through Shout! Factory TV and Tokushoutsu.

Mill Creek Entertainment released Ultraman Mebius in the United States on DVD May 24, 2022.

Reception
In the first half of airing, it struggled in terms of viewership due to the time shift from Ultraman Max. However, after the release of the Ultraman Mebius & Ultra Brothers movie, awareness of the series increased, and the viewership ratings reached their highest level since Ultraman Nexus, and toy sales at the end of the year were also strong. In particular, the episodes featuring the Ultra Brothers received support from a wide range of viewers, including not only the main target audience of children, but also parents and enthusiasts. However, overall toy sales in 2006 were 3.6 billion, lower than the sales of the previous two titles.

See also 
 Ultra Series - Complete list of official Ultraman-related shows.

References

External links
Tsuburaya Productions - The Official Home of Ultraman (Japanese)
Official Website of Ultraman Mebius & Ultraman Brothers (Japanese) 
Official Website (CBC) (Japanese)
Official Website (TBS) (Japanese)

2006 Japanese television series debuts
2007 Japanese television series endings
Ultra television series
Crossover tokusatsu television series
Television duos